|}

The Buckingham Palace Stakes is a flat handicap horse race in Great Britain open to horses aged three and over. It is run at Ascot over a distance of 7 furlongs (1,408 metres), and is currently scheduled to take place each year in June on the third day of the Royal Ascot meeting.

The Buckingham Palace Stakes was established in 2002, when the Royal Ascot meeting was extended to a fifth day to mark the Golden Jubilee of Elizabeth II and was named after Buckingham Palace, the London residence of the British monarch. It was last run in 2014 and replaced from the 2015 Royal Ascot meeting by a new Group One sprint race, the Commonwealth Cup. The Sporting Life called the loss of the only 7-furlong handicap at Royal Ascot "a mistake".

In 2020, the race returned as part of an expanded Royal Ascot programme, following the 10-week suspension of horse racing in the United Kingdom due to the COVID-19 pandemic.  The revival was intended to be a one-off event but the race was retained from 2021 when the Royal Ascot meeting was permanently expanded to included seven races each day.

Records
Leading jockey (3 wins):
 Neil Callan – Uhoomagoo (2006), Eton Forever (2012), Lightning Cloud (2013)

Leading trainer (2 wins):
 Kevin Ryan – Uhoomagoo (2006), Lightning Cloud (2013)

Winners

See also
 Horse racing in Great Britain
 List of British flat horse races

References

 Racing Post:

Ascot Racecourse
Flat races in Great Britain
Open mile category horse races
Recurring sporting events established in 2002
Recurring sporting events disestablished in 2014
2002 establishments in England
2014 disestablishments in England
Recurring sporting events established in 2020
2020 establishments in England